Phan Thanh Liêm (潘清簾, August 29, 1833 – 1896), was a Vietnamese soldier, politician, nationalist and (anti-French) independence activist.

He was the son of Phan Thanh Giản.

See also 
 France-Vietnam relations

Notes

External links 
 Phan Thanh Liem
 Phan Thanh Liem's Viegle.
 Phan Thanh Liem 

1833 births
1896 deaths
People of the Cochinchina campaign
Nguyen dynasty officials